Adamsburg is an unincorporated community located on Lookout Mountain in eastern DeKalb County, Alabama, United States, southeast of the county seat of Fort Payne, and just west of Little River Canyon.

History
Adamsburg was named for Simon Russell Canfield Adams, a minister from Fort Payne who donated land for a school in the community. A post office was established in Adamsburg in 1902, but it has since closed.

Geography

Demographics

Adamsburg Precinct (1930-50)

Adamsburg has never reported a population figure separately on the U.S. Census as an unincorporated community. However, the 20th census precinct within DeKalb County bore its name from 1930 to 1950 (the precinct previously having been named Moores from 1890 to 1920). In the 1930 and 1940 returns, when the census recorded racial statistics for the precincts, both times reported a White majority for the precinct. In 1960, the precincts were merged and/or reorganized into census divisions (as part of a general reorganization of counties) and it was consolidated into the present census division of Fort Payne.

References

Unincorporated communities in Alabama
Unincorporated communities in DeKalb County, Alabama
Populated places established in 1902